Steve Neal may refer to:

 Stephen L. Neal (born 1934), U.S. Representative from North Carolina
 Steve Neal (historian) (1949–2004), American journalist and historian
 Stephen Neal (born 1976), American football player
 Stephen Neal (lawyer), American attorney